Kinzua Creek  is a  tributary of the Allegheny River in McKean County, Pennsylvania in the United States.

The upper reaches of the creek pass through Kinzua Bridge State Park, where the creek was spanned by the Kinzua Viaduct until a tornado destroyed the viaduct in 2003.

The location is also the former location of Kinzua, an unincorporated community that was wiped out as a result of the construction of the Kinzua Dam; it previously formed the boundary between Kinzua and (West) Corydon before both communities were dissolved in the 1960s.

See also
List of rivers of Pennsylvania
List of tributaries of the Allegheny River

References

External links

U.S. Geological Survey: PA stream gaging stations
Kinzua Bridge State Park
U.S. Army Corps of Engineers Kinzua Dam and Allegheny Reservoir

Rivers of Pennsylvania
Tributaries of the Allegheny River
Rivers of McKean County, Pennsylvania